Prolasius advenus is a species of ant in the genus Prolasius. It is endemic to New Zealand, widespread across the North and South Islands, including offshore islands. It is a relatively small ant, with workers 2.9-3.5mm in length. Its common name is small brown bush ant.

Biology 
Colonies can include hundreds of workers and multiple queens. Prolasius advenus is found in a variety of forest habitats. It is a generalist forager, preying upon and scavenging small arthropods, as well as tending mealy-bugs and scale insects for honeydew.

References

External links

 AntWiki lists the species under the synonym Prolasius advena
 Lessons from Little Creatures: article on New Zealand ants from NZ National Geographic.

Formicinae
Ants of New Zealand
Insects described in 1862
Endemic fauna of New Zealand
Taxa named by Frederick Smith (entomologist)

Hymenoptera of New Zealand
Endemic insects of New Zealand